Ingvild Julie Thue Jensen (born 1979) is a Norwegian experimental physicist working mainly with photoemission spectroscopy on semiconductor nanostructures and battery materials. She is Senior Research Scientist at SINTEF and an associated researcher at the University of Oslo in Norway.

Education and career
Jensen completed her master's degree from the Department of Physics, University of Oslo, in 2006 and earned a doctorate (PhD) in physics in 2013 with a dissertation entitled Combined experimental and computational study of the meta-stable Mg-Ti-H system.

Jensen was in 2019 awarded a prestigious Young Research talent project from the Norwegian Research Council. In the project named "Novel (M,Ga)2O3 thin films for two-dimensional electron gas devices (GO2DEVICE)", fabrication of a high-electron-mobility transistor (HEMT) based on novel (M,Ga)2O3 thin film heterostructures will be pursued (M = Al, In). Leading up to this project she has specialized in using photoemission spectroscopy to study band gap variations and band alignment in semiconducting materials. In addition to the GO2DEVICE project she is active in several research projects such as "A highly efficient and stable electrode for solar-driven water electrolysis, interrogated by advanced operando and in situ techniques" (Solopp) and the project "Centrifuge Nano Technology: Nano silicon anodes for Li-ion batteries" (DOVRE).

References

External links
 "A highly efficient and stable electrode for solar-driven water electrolysis, interrogated by advanced operando and in situ techniques" (Solopp)
 "Centrifuge Nano Technology: Nano silicon anodes for Li-ion batteries" (DOVRE)

1979 births
Living people
Norwegian physicists
Women physicists
University of Oslo alumni